Tibicos, or water kefir, is a traditional fermented drink made with water and a symbiotic culture of bacteria and yeasts (SCOBY) held in a polysaccharide biofilm matrix created by the bacteria. 
It is sometimes consumed as an alternative to milk-based probiotic drinks or tea-cultured products such as kombucha. Water kefir is typically made as a probiotic homebrew beverage. The finished product, if bottled, will produce a carbonated beverage.

Cultures
Tibicos cultures are found around the world, with no two being exactly the same; but typical tibicos have a mix of Lactobacillus, Streptococcus, Pediococcus and Leuconostoc bacteria, with yeasts from Saccharomyces, Candida, Kloeckera and possibly others. Lactobacillus brevis bacteria has been identified as the species responsible for the production of the dextran polysaccharide that forms the "grains."

As with milk kefir "grains", the microbes present in tibicos act in symbiosis to maintain a stable culture. Tibicos can do this in many different sugary liquids, feeding off the sugar to produce lactic acid, alcohol (ethanol), and carbon dioxide gas, which carbonates the drink.

Origin
The origin of tibicos grains is unknown. Tibicos grains form as hard granules on the pads of the Opuntia cactus found in Mexico. These granules then could be reconstituted in a sugar-water solution for propagating the tibicos grains. Another study found a similar tibicos culture made from bacteria cultured from known stocks with similar properties.

Tibicos are also known as tibi, water kefir grains, sugar kefir grains, Japanese water crystals and California bees, and in older literature as bébées, African bees, Australian bees, ginger bees, vinegar bees, bees, Japanese beer seeds, beer seeds, beer plant, ale nuts, eternity grains, and Balm of Gilead. Pidoux in 1898 also identified the sugary kefir grains with the ginger beer plant. Different ingredients or hygienic conditions might also change the bacteriological composition possibly leading to the different names found in scientific literature.

Tibicos are used to brew a variety of tepache known as tepache de tibicos. The ginger beer plant is also a form of tibicos. Kebler attests that they were used in Kentucky circa 1859 to brew a "home drink" and were referred to as "Japanese beer seeds."

Preparation 

The basic preparation method is for tibicos to be added to a sugary liquid and fermented 24 to 48 hours. If the temperature is towards the upper end of this range, the fermentation period is shortened. A typical recipe might contain the tibicos culture, a citrus fruit, and water.

Some ingredients will inhibit fermentation, such as chlorine in tap water or preservatives in dried fruit (sulfites). The fruits used are changed and mixed to create different flavors.

Additional precautions are taken to keep the cultures healthy. The use of reactive metals such as aluminium, copper, or zinc are minimized, since the acidity of the solution will draw these metals out, damaging the culture. Instead, plastic, lead-free ceramic, or glass containers are commonly used. It is recommended to culture grains in a glass jar and use clean plastic or wooden utensils when handling the grains.

See also 
 Kefir
 Kombucha

External links 
Water Kefir: A Review of its Microbiological Profile, Antioxidant Potential and Sensory Quality 
An update on water kefir: Microbiology, composition and production
Development of new non-dairy beverages from Mediterranean fruit juices fermented with water kefir microorganisms 
Characterization of kefir-like beverages produced from vegetable juice
Functional Exploitation of Carob, Oat Flour, and Whey Permeate as Substrates for a Novel Kefir-Like Fermented Beverage: An Optimized Formulation
Development, Characterization, and Bioactivity of Non-Dairy Kefir-Like Fermented Beverage Based on Flaxseed Oil Cake 
5 Scientific Benefits of Water Kefir
Antioxidant potency of water kefir
Water Kefir and Derived Pasteurized Beverages Modulate Gut Microbiota, Intestinal Permeability and Cytokine Production In Vitro
Study of anti-inflammatory activity of Tibetan mushroom, a symbiotic culture of bacteria and fungi encapsulated into a polysaccharide matrix
Probiotic Potential of Lactobacillus paracasei CT12 Isolated from Water Kefir Grains (Tibicos)
Water kefir: Factors affecting grain growth and health-promoting properties of the fermented beverage
Anti-Inflammatory and Cicatrizing Activities of a Carbohydrate Fraction Isolated from Sugary Kefir
Antimicrobial Activity of Broth Fermented with Kefir Grains
Microbial Species Diversity, Community Dynamics, and Metabolite Kinetics of Water Kefir Fermentation
The Buffer Capacity and Calcium Concentration of Water Influence the Microbial Species Diversity, Grain Growth, and Metabolite Production During Water Kefir Fermentation
Pollution Abatement of Heavy Metals in Different Conditions by Water Kefir Grains as a Protective Tool against Toxicity
Quantitative insights on the interaction between metal ions and water kefir grains: kinetics studies and EPR investigations

References

Fermented foods
Fermented drinks